Telosphrantis is a genus of moths in the family Choreutidae, containing only one species, Telosphrantis aethiopica, which is known from Ethiopia.

The length of the forewings is about 7 mm. The head is brown with some buff scales mixed in. The thorax is brown and the forewings are unicolorous dark brown or fuscous, with one narrow buff mark on the costal margin. The hindwings are unicolorous fuscous.

Taxonomy
The genus was described and placed in the family Yponomeutidae by Edward Meyrickin 1932. The genus and species was not studied again until Clarke examined specimens at the British Museum in 1965 and selected a lectotype. Clarke retained the species in Yponomeutidae. Study of the type and syntypes led to a transfer to the family Choreutidae.

References

Endemic fauna of Ethiopia
Choreutidae
Insects of Ethiopia
Moths of Africa